Adele Leigh (15 June 1928 – 23 May 2004) was an English operatic soprano, later the wife of the Austrian ambassador in London.

Early life
Leigh was born in Hackney, East London on 15 June 1928. Her father left when she was two and she was brought up in Highbury by her mother, Betty, and her Polish-Jewish immigrant grandparents. At the start of World War II, the family moved to Reading, where they all shared one rented room in a large house. A few years later, the family returned to London, and she went to Crouch End High School for Girls.

Leigh trained at RADA and later at the Juilliard School, New York, and in 1948 joined the opera company at Covent Garden.

Career
In 1948, Leigh was recruited by the Royal Opera at Covent Garden and was, at 19 years old, the youngest principal among such future stars as Geraint Evans and Sylvia Fisher. The previous day, impresario C. B. Cochran had signed her in the leading role of Bless the Bride, a new musical by Vivian Ellis and A. P. Herbert. After much negotiating, Cochran released Leigh from the contract.

Leigh made her Covent Garden debut as Countess Ceprano in Verdi's Rigoletto. She first achieved critical notice as Barbarina in The Marriage of Figaro, soon adding Susanna and Cherubino to her repertoire. She went on to sing Pamina in The Magic Flute and the title role in Massenet's Manon, which she learnt in a week. She sang Sophie in Strauss's Der Rosenkavalier, under Erich Kleiber, and the Marzelline in Beethoven's Fidelio under Rudolf Kempe.

In 1958, she acted in Davy, the last Ealing Comedy to be made by Ealing Studios, directed by Michael Relph and starring Harry Secombe, Alexander Knox and Ron Randell.

In 1958, she performed at the Royal Variety Performance.

Leigh appeared twice on Desert Island Discs, in 1965 and 1988.

Personal life
After her Covent Garden career, she married American bass-baritone James Pease, a widower 15 years her senior, who soon died from a heart attack while they were both singing at the Zürich Opera.

In 1967, she met and, within a fortnight, married , then Austrian Ambassador to Hungary and later to the UK.

She died on 23 May 2004.

Notes and references
Notes

References

1928 births
2004 deaths
People from London
English operatic sopranos
English film actresses
Juilliard School alumni
Alumni of RADA
English people of Polish descent
20th-century British women opera singers